Efecto Pasillo is a Spanish alternative rock/pop rock band formed in the Canary Islands. Their music also includes elements of funk and Latin sounds.

History

Beginnings
Efecto Pasillo started as a band in 2007, winning a music band competition. After that they recorded their first demo, En el aire, which was played on several local radio stations. Music producer Tato Latorre traveled from Barcelona to the Canary Islands to listen to them live in a concert, and he was so impressed that he took the band under his wing.

Self-titled debut album
In early 2010 they launched Efecto Pasillo, their self-titled debut album. Their debut single, Chacho, made them famous at a national level, to the point they were hand-picked by Hombres G as the opening act for their national tour. This turned Efecto Pasillo into one of the most important bands in the Canary Islands.

By that time the band had already landed deals with label Vicious Records and promoting agency M2 Music Group. Also on 2010 they won the "Breakout Band of the Year" award in Gran Canaria.

2010-present
Thanks to the success of Chacho, they toured Spain playing live on national televisions such as Televisión Española, Antena 3, laSexta or Televisió de Catalunya. Antena 3 also picked their track Pan y mantequilla as the "song of the summer" in 2012. This song was the first single of their next album, El misterioso caso de...

Pan y mantequilla landed the band their first two nominations at Los Premios 40 Principales, being contenders to Best Spanish New Artist and Best Spanish Song, which they ultimately lost out to Auryn and Pablo Alborán, respectively. They would also get a shot at the Best Spanish Album award in the 2013 edition, losing again to Alborán.

Members
Iván Torres - vocals
Javier Moreno - drums
Nau Barreto - guitar
Arturo Sosa - bass

Discography

Albums

Singles

See also 
 Music of Spain

References

 https://web.archive.org/web/20140923092227/http://efectopasillo.com/biografia
 http://www.lovecanarias.com/personalidad/efecto-pasillo
 http://www.laopinion.es/cultura/2012/09/23/efecto-pasillo-historia/436177.html
 https://web.archive.org/web/20121129073609/http://www.efectopasillo.com/noticias/nominados-mejor-artista-revelacion-y-mejor-cancion-en-los-premios-40-principales-2012

External links
 Official website
 MySpace page

Spanish musical groups
Spanish rock music groups
Spanish pop rock music groups
Spanish alternative rock groups
Rock en Español music groups